John Henry Carter (11 November 1910  – 2 July 1992) was an English professional footballer. He was born in Aylesbury.

During his career he played as a centre forward for Watford, Reading and Ipswich Town for whom he was top scorer in their first season as a professional club. Following his retirement from playing, Carter spent time working as a steward at Reading's stadium, Elm Park. He died in Reading, aged 81.

References

1910 births
1992 deaths
English Football League players
Ipswich Town F.C. players
Watford F.C. players
Reading F.C. players
Sportspeople from Aylesbury
English footballers
Association football forwards
Footballers from Buckinghamshire